Henry S. Sneed, last name sometimes spelled Snead, was enslaved before becoming a farmer and state legislator in Texas. He was elected to the Texas House of Representatives in 1876 from Waller County, Texas, Wharton County Texas, and Fort Bend County, Texas. He was one of 3 African Americans in Texas 15th legislature.

He was born in Marshall, Texas. His wife's name was Emma. He was photographed with a mustache.

See also
Fifteenth Texas Legislature
African-American officeholders during and following the Reconstruction era

References

American former slaves
African-American state legislators in Texas
Members of the Texas House of Representatives
African-American politicians during the Reconstruction Era
Year of birth missing
Year of death unknown
Place of birth unknown
Place of death unknown
People from Fort Bend County, Texas
People from Waller County, Texas
People from Wharton County, Texas